Since 1 April 1996, Wales has been divided into 22 single-tier principal areas, styled as counties or county boroughs ( or ) for local government purposes. The elected councils of these areas are responsible for the provision of all local government services, including education, social work, environmental protection, and most highways. Below these there are also (in most, but not all, parts of the principal areas) elected community councils to which responsibility for specific aspects of the application of local policy may be devolved. The last set of local elections in Wales took place in 2022, with the next due to take place in 2027.

The monarch appoints a lord lieutenant as a representative in each of the eight preserved counties of Wales, which are combinations of principal areas retained for ceremonial purposes.

Subdivisions of Wales created for such purposes as the organisation of the National Health Service and the provision of police and emergency services are made up of combinations of principal areas. For example, the Dyfed–Powys Police force operates in the area covered by the principal areas of Pembrokeshire, Ceredigion, and Carmarthenshire as well as in Powys – the former three constituting the preserved county of Dyfed.

Principal areas

There are 22 principal areas in Wales. They came into being on 1 April 1996 by virtue of the Local Government (Wales) Act 1994 (1994 c. 19). Eleven are counties, including the cities of Cardiff and Swansea, and eleven are county boroughs (marked †), including the city of Newport.

Locations of each council headquarters are indicated by yellow markers.

Name changes
The current names of certain unitary authority areas are different from those specified in the Local Government (Wales) Act 1994.  The following changes took place, all with effect from 2 April 1996:

Conwy from Aberconwy and Colwyn
Isle of Anglesey from Anglesey
Gwynedd from Caernarfonshire and Merionethshire
Ceredigion from Cardiganshire
Neath Port Talbot from Neath and Port Talbot

Governance

Like councils throughout the UK, Welsh councils are made up of elected councillors. Exceptionally, because of political in-fighting and a history of poor performance, the executive functions of the Isle of Anglesey Council were temporarily taken over by commissioners appointed by the Welsh Government. Elections planned for 2012 were delayed until 2013.

Local government elections normally take place every four years, though the Wales Act 2017 prevented local government elections from taking place in the same year as elections to the Senedd (Welsh Parliament). Hence the Local Authorities (Change to the Year of Ordinary Elections (Wales) Order 2019 postponed the date of the May 2021 local elections to May 2022.

Preserved counties of Wales

For ceremonial purposes of Lieutenancy and Shrievalty, Wales is divided into eight preserved counties which are based on the counties created by the Local Government Act 1972 and used for local government and other purposes between 1974 and their abolition in 1996.

Historic counties of Wales

The historic counties of Wales are ancient subdivisions of Wales, used for various functions for several hundred years. Pembrokeshire was formed as a county palatine in 1138. In the south east, Norman advancement led to the creation of marcher lordships, such as Glamorgan, which served as semi-autonomous administrative divisions, although these were not counties in the true sense as they lacked the formal structure. Some towns within these areas did, however, receive charters which outlined rights and duties in much the same way as a borough. Counties in the strict sense first appeared with the establishment of Cardiganshire and Carmarthenshire in the 1240s. In 1284 the Principality of Gwynedd was divided into three counties: Anglesey, Caernarvonshire and Merionethshire. Before the end of the century, Flintshire had also become a county, and thus nearly half the territory of Wales was under the rule of the English Crown. While the arrangement did not officially bring the marcher lordships in the South directly under the King's control, many such lordships were held by the King personally, although some remained under the semi-autonomous control of powerful local families. The formation of counties was completed under the Laws in Wales Act 1535, which created Montgomeryshire, Denbighshire, Radnorshire, Brecknockshire and Monmouthshire, many from existing marcher lordships now recreated as counties proper.

These 13 counties were the main administrative subdivisions of Wales from 1536 until the implementation in 1974 of the Local Government Act 1972, although the definition and role of the smaller county boroughs within the counties during that period saw considerable change, as it did across the United Kingdom.

Communities

At the lowest level of administrative subdivision in Wales are the communities, into which each principal area is subdivided. They may have elected community councils which perform a number of roles, such as providing local facilities, and representing their communities to larger local government bodies. Community councils are the equivalent of English parish councils. A community council may call itself a "town council" if it so wishes. The councils of three communities with city status – Bangor, St Asaph, and St Davids – are known as "city councils". Communities which are too small to have a council may have a community meeting instead: an example of direct democracy. The communities in the urban areas of the cities of Cardiff, Swansea and Newport do not have community councils.

Police and fire services

Police forces

There are four police forces in Wales. These are:

Fire and rescue services
There are three fire and rescue services in Wales. The present Welsh fire services date from 1996. Each covers a number of principal areas. These are:

City-regions

City regions are partnerships between local several authorities. As of April 2021, there are four statutory city region agreements in Wales:
Cardiff Capital Region
Growing Mid Wales Partnership
North Wales Economic Ambition Board
Swansea Bay City Region

International Territorial Level
For statistical purposes, Wales is divided into statistical regions by the UK's Office for National Statistics, using the International Territorial Level geocode standard since 2021. Prior to 2021, as part of the European Union and Eurostat, the system used was Nomenclature of Territorial Units for Statistics (NUTS), with "UK" in any NUTS code replaced with "TL" for Territorial Level from 2021. Wales itself is a level 1 ITL region alongside Scotland, Northern Ireland and the 9 statistical regions of England, with the code for the Wales ITL 1 region being "TLL" ("UKL" under NUTS), which is subdivided as follows:

History

Proposals to reform

Williams Commission
In April 2013, it was announced that a major review was to be undertaken into local government organisation in Wales, with a Commission on Public Service Governance and Delivery being established, to be chaired by Sir Paul Williams. First Minister Carwyn Jones said: "Since public sector budgets are likely to continue to tighten, and demand pressures grow, there is a clear need to examine how services can be sustained and standards of performance raised, so that people in Wales can continue to receive and influence the public services they need and value."

The Commission reported on 20 January 2014.  It recommended that the number of councils be reduced, through mergers rather than through boundary changes, from 22 to 10, 11 or 12; and suggested that the cost of merging the councils would be met through savings made within about two years.

Wales' First Minister Carwyn Jones said: "This report addresses many issues that are critical at a time when the need for public services is outstripping the resources available to provide them. I have always been clear that the status quo is not an option.  Change is inevitable and essential so that our public services can become more efficient, effective, accessible and responsive." Janet Finch-Saunders AM, shadow minister for local government, said: "What matters to the vast majority of hardworking families is not the intricate structures of local government, but knowing that services will be delivered in an efficient and cost effective way.... We believe that public services are best delivered locally so taxpayers can hold local representatives to account for what happens in their community."  Rhodri Glyn Thomas, for Plaid Cymru, commented: "The weight of evidence presented to the Williams Commission shows that if the people of Wales are going to get the services they need and deserve then there has to be a radical improvement in the way public services are delivered."

Draft Local Government (Wales) Bill
In response to recommendations made by the Williams Commission, the Welsh Government published a draft local government bill in November 2015. The draft bill contained two proposals, one for eight local authorities and one for nine local authorities. The difference between the two proposals is related to North Wales (two or three local authorities). The bill did not propose names for the local authorities, only listing them by number as a combination of existing principal areas. Powys was not affected by either proposal. The changes were planned to take effect in April 2020.

Eight local authorities model

Nine local authorities model

2016 redrafting and abandonment
Following the 2016 assembly elections, First Minister Carwyn Jones announced that the proposals for local government reform would be taken "back to the drawing board" and that a new consensus on how to reform local government in Wales would be sought. The merger plans were formally dropped in January 2017, when the Welsh Government instead began a consultation on wider reform of local governance arrangements. The number of councils are to remain as they currently are, unless two or more local authorities wish to pursue a voluntary merger.

2017 white paper
A white paper titled "Reforming Local Government: Resilient and Renewed" was published in January 2017. It proposed the formation of regional bodies to encourage better collaboration between existing local authorities and a possible change in the electoral system used in local elections from "first past the post" to the "Single transferable vote" system.

2018 green paper
A new green paper, "Strengthening Local Government: Delivering for People", was published in 2018. The paper makes the case for a reduction of the number of local authorities from 22 to 10 and suggested three possible approaches, a system of voluntary mergers, a phased approach with authorities merging in either 2022 or 2026 or a comprehensive system of mergers to occur in 2022.

Local Government and Elections (Wales) Act 2021

A bill was introduced by the Welsh Government in November 2019 to reform local government in Wales. The bill contains provisions to reduce the voting age from 18 to 16 for local elections in Wales and will extend the franchise to include eligible foreign nationals. It extends the term of local councillors from four years to five years. The bill will allow local councils to decide to continue to hold elections under first past the post system or to switch to the single transferable vote system. The bill does not include provisions to restructure local councils but does contain mechanisms that can allow for two or more authorities to merge on a voluntary basis. It also creates a framework for joint regional coordination between local authorities through the formation of "corporate joint committees". The bill received Royal Assent in January 2021.

Cities

There are seven cities in total in Wales, as determined by their individual awarding of city status. South Wales' largest settlements of Cardiff, Swansea and Newport have the status, as does North Wales' largest settlement Wrexham. The smaller communities of Bangor, St Davids and St Asaph also have the status. City status is granted by letters patent. 

 Bangor – time indeterminate
 Cardiff – 1905
 Swansea – 1969
 St Davids – 1994
 Newport – 2002
 St Asaph – 2012
 Wrexham – 2022

St Asaph, as the seat of a bishopric, was historically referred to as a city, and was described as such in the 1911 Encyclopædia Britannica. The status was, however, not officially recognised for many years. When city status was restored to St Davids in 1994, St Asaph town council submitted a petition for the same purpose. The petition was refused as, unlike St Davids, there was no evidence of any charter or letters patent in the past conferring the status. Applications for city status in competitions in 2000 and 2002 were unsuccessful. However, city status was finally granted to St Asaph in 2012 as part of the Queen's Diamond Jubilee celebrations: St Asaph was selected "to recognise its wealth of history, its cultural contribution and its metropolitan status as a centre for technology, commerce and business". Wrexham was awarded city status as part of the Queen's Platinum Jubilee in September 2022.

See also 

 List of political parties in Wales
 List of Welsh principal areas
 List of Welsh areas by percentage of Welsh-speakers
 Welsh Government
 Geography of Wales
 List of communities in Wales
 List of electoral wards in Wales
 ISO 3166-2:GB, subdivision codes for the United Kingdom
 Local government in England
 Local government in Northern Ireland
 Local government in Scotland
 Political make-up of local councils in the United Kingdom#Wales
 Regions of Wales

Notes

References

Citations

Sources 

 CIA World Factbook 2002

External links 
 Williams Commission report, January 2014
LocalGov.co.uk – News updates on UK local government, including reorganisation
Map of the UK counties and unitary administrations
Map of all UK local authorities